South Tyneside District Hospital is a healthcare facility providing healthcare services for South Shields, Jarrow, Hebburn, Boldon, Cleadon and Whitburn. It is managed by South Tyneside and Sunderland NHS Foundation Trust.

History
The hospital has its origins in an infirmary which was built for the South Shields Poor Law Union and which opened in 1880. The infirmary became known as the Harton Institution and General Hospital by 1930 and, after joining the National Health Service in 1948, became the South Shields General Hospital. After services were transferred from the Ingham Infirmary at Westoe, the new Ingham Wing was built and the enlarged facilities became known as South Tyneside District Hospital in April 1993.

The Trust won a contract from South Tyneside Council to develop an integrated care services hub, to be built as a standalone facility on the hospital site in August 2014.

Services

Sunderland and South Tyneside clinical commissioning groups decided in February 2018 to centralise hospital based stroke, maternity, gynaecology and paediatric services at Sunderland Royal Hospital, so the services at South Tyneside will be closed or downgraded.  A 14 hour a day, nurse led paediatric minor injuries and illnesses service at South Tyneside will be established in their place.

See also
 List of NHS trusts

References

NHS hospitals in England
Hospitals in Tyne and Wear
Poor law infirmaries
Buildings and structures in South Shields